The Mullin Automotive Museum is a privately owned automobile museum in Oxnard, California, US. Established in 2010, it displays the personal car collection of businessman and philanthropist Peter W. Mullin.  The museum has a large collection of vintage Bugattis, and many of the cars are fully restored and able to be driven.

The museum is housed in the building formerly occupied by the Chandler Vintage Museum of Transportation and Wildlife.  The  building was remodeled to be more energy efficient by American architect David Randall Hertz, making use of solar panels and reflective roofing to reduce heat, yet incorporating elements that retain the Art Deco style and motifs in order to match the era of the cars, many of which were made by French manufacturers in the 1920s and 1930s.

Although it is primarily known for its selection of classic French automobiles and grand prix race cars, the Mullin also houses a collection of Art-Deco furniture and contemporary paintings and sculpture.

See also
List of automobile museums

References

Notes

Bibliography

External links

Mullin Automotive Museum – official site

Automobile museums in California
Buildings and structures in Oxnard, California
Culture of Oxnard, California
Museums in Ventura County, California